Pengjun Wan from the Illinois Institute of Technology, Chicago, IL was named Fellow of the Institute of Electrical and Electronics Engineers (IEEE) in 2016 for contributions to scheduling and resource allocation in wireless networks.

References 

Fellow Members of the IEEE
Illinois Institute of Technology faculty
21st-century American engineers
Living people
Year of birth missing (living people)
Place of birth missing (living people)